"Where You Stand" is a song by alternative rock band Travis, written by Dougie Payne, Holly Partridge and Fran Healy. It was released on 30 April 2013 as the lead single from the band's seventh studio album, Where You Stand.

Music video
A music video for the song was released onto YouTube on 30 April 2013. The video was directed by Blair Young and Travis' lead singer Fran Healy, and cinematographed by David Liddell.

Track listing

Personnel
Travis
Fran Healy – lead vocals, guitar
Dougie Payne – bass guitar
Andy Dunlop – guitar
Neil Primrose – drums

References

2013 singles
Travis (band) songs
Songs written by Fran Healy (musician)
Songs written by Dougie Payne
2013 songs